Sentul LRT station is an elevated light rapid transit (LRT) station operated by Rapid Rail located in Sentul, Kuala Lumpur, Malaysia. It is served by the Ampang Line and Sri Petaling Line. This station is situated next to two secondary schools, the Methodist Boys Secondary School Sentul and the Wesley Methodist School, three primary schools, and several medium-density, low-cost housing developments.

Despite sharing the same name, the Sentul LRT station is not interchangeable with the  Sentul Komuter station; the two stations are approximately 800 meters in walking distance away from each other. The Komuter station was the first rail transit station in Sentul and served the older section of the suburb, while the LRT station was a later addition and serves the newer development of the suburb. (hence the location Bandar Baru Sentul is added to the LRT station on official rail transit maps to avoid confusion) The station was opened to public in 1998 as part of the final phase of development of the former STAR LRT Line.

History

The station is served by the Ampang Line and Sri Petaling Line. Opened in 1998 as part of the line's second phase of development, the station was intended to connect Sentul to other parts of the city and surrounding areas. Under Phase 2, a 15 km track with 11 stations was built to serve the northern and southern areas of Kuala Lumpur to cater for the Commonwealth Village and National Sports Complex in Bukit Jalil, during the KL Commonwealth Games in 1998. At that time, Sentul station was named as "Bandar Baru Sentul" station.

Station layout
The station is a typical elevated Ampang Line and Sri Petaling Line station, the platform level is on the topmost floor, consisting of two sheltered side platforms along a double tracked line; there is a single concourse housing ticketing facilities between the ground level and the platform level. The design is similar to that of most other stations on the line, with multi-tiered roofs supported by latticed frames, and white plastered walls and pillars. All levels are linked by stairways and escalators.

References

Ampang Line
Railway stations opened in 1998